Sansonetti is an Italian surname. Notable people with the surname include: 

Étienne Sansonetti (1935–2018), French football player
Federico Sansonetti (born 1986), Uruguayan tennis player
Luigi Sansonetti (1888–1959), Italian admiral
Philippe Sansonetti (born 1949), French microbiologist
Remo Sansonetti (born 1946), Australian cyclist
Sal Sansonetti (born 1946), Australian cyclist
Sarah Sansonetti (born 2001), Australian football player
Tom Sansonetti (born 1949), American attorney and government official from Wyoming
Ugo Sansonetti (1919–2019), Italian writer and athlete

Italian-language surnames